The Moro River Campaign order of battle is a listing of the significant formations that were involved in the fighting during the Moro River Campaign in December 1943, part of the Italian Campaign of World War II.

Allied Forces and organisation

Allied Armies in Italy
 Commander-in-Chief: General Sir Harold Alexander

British Eighth Army
 General Bernard Law Montgomery

V Corps
Lieutenant-General Charles Allfrey

  1st Canadian Infantry Division
 Major-General Christopher Vokes
 No. 1 Defense and Employment Platoon (Lorne Scots)
 1st Canadian Infantry Brigade
 The Royal Canadian Regiment
 The Hastings and Prince Edward Regiment
 48th Highlanders of Canada
 2nd Canadian Infantry Brigade
 Princess Patricia’s Canadian Light Infantry
 The Seaforth Highlanders of Canada
 The Loyal Edmonton Regiment
 3rd Canadian Infantry Brigade
 Royal 22e Régiment
 The Carleton and York Regiment
 The West Nova Scotia Regiment
 1st Canadian Armoured Brigade
 11th Armoured Regiment (The Ontario Regiment)
 12th Armoured Regiment (Three Rivers Regiment)
 14th Armoured Regiment (The Calgary Regiment)

  8th Indian Infantry Division
  Major-General Dudley Russell
 6th Duke of Connaught's Own (Bengal) Lancers
 5th Battalion, (Machine Gun) 5th Mahratta Light Infantry
 17th Indian Infantry Brigade
 1st Battalion, Royal Fusiliers
 1st Battalion, 12th Frontier Force Regiment
 1st Battalion, 5th Royal Gurkha Rifles (Frontier Force)
 19th Indian Infantry Brigade
 1/5th Battalion, Essex Regiment
 3rd Battalion, 8th Punjab Regiment
 6th Royal Battalion 13th Frontier Force Rifles
 21st Indian Infantry Brigade
 5th Battalion, Queen's Own Royal West Kent Regiment
 1st Battalion, 5th Mahratta Light Infantry
 3rd Battalion, 15th Punjab Regiment
 4th British Armoured Brigade
 44th Royal Tank Regiment
 50th Royal Tank Regiment
 3rd County of London Yeomanry (Sharpshooters)
 2nd Battalion, King's Royal Rifle Corps

XIII Corps
Lieutenant-General Miles Dempsey

  2nd New Zealand Division
 Lieutenant-General Bernard Freyberg
 4th New Zealand Armoured Brigade
 18th Armoured Regiment
 19th Armoured Regiment
 20th Armoured Regiment
 5th New Zealand Infantry Brigade
 22nd Battalion
 23rd Battalion
 28th (Maori) Battalion
 6th New Zealand Infantry Brigade
 24th Battalion
 25th Battalion
 26th Battalion
 27th Machine Gun Battalion
 2nd British Parachute Brigade
 4th Parachute Battalion
 5th (Scottish) Parachute Battalion
 6th (Royal Welch) Parachute Battalion
 1st Independent Glider Pilot Squadron, Glider Pilot Regiment

  5th British Infantry Division
 Major-General Gerard Bucknall
 13th Infantry Brigade
 2nd Battalion, Cameronians (Scottish Rifles)
 2nd Battalion, Royal Inniskilling Fusiliers
 2nd Battalion, Wiltshire Regiment
 15th Infantry Brigade
 1st Battalion, Green Howards
 1st Battalion, King's Own Yorkshire Light Infantry
 1st Battalion, York and Lancaster Regiment
 17th Infantry Brigade
 2nd Battalion, Royal Scots Fusiliers
 2nd Battalion, Northamptonshire Regiment
 6th Battalion, Seaforth Highlanders
 5th Reconnaissance Regiment, Reconnaissance Corps
 7th Battalion, Cheshire Regiment

German forces and organisation

German Army Group C
  Albert Kesselring

German Tenth Army
 Lieutenant General Joachim Lemelsen

German LXXVI Panzer Corps
 General Traugott Herr

  1st Parachute Division
 Generalmajor Richard Heidrich
 1st Parachute Regiment
 3rd Parachute Regiment
 4th Parachute Regiment
 1st Parachute Artillery Regiment
 1st Parachute Anti-tank Battalion

  26th Panzer Division
 Generalleutnant Smilo Freiherr von Lüttwitz
 26th Panzer Regiment
 9th Panzergrenadier Regiment
 67th Panzergrenadier Regiment
 93rd Panzer Artillery Regiment
 93rd Anti-tank battalion
 26th Reconnaissance Battalion

   65th Infantry Division
 Generalmajor Hellmuth Pfeifer
 145th Grenadier Regiment
 146th Grenadier Regiment
 147th Grenadier Regiment
 165th Artillery Regiment
 165th Anti-tank Battalion
 165th Reconnaissance Battalion

  90th Panzergrenadier Division
 Generalleutnant Carl-Hans Lungershausen (thru 20 Dec)
 Oberst Ernst-Günther Baade (from 21 Dec)
 155th Panzergrenadier Regiment
 200th Panzergrenadier Regiment
 361st Panzergrenadier Regiment
 190th Artillery Regiment
 190th Panzer Battalion
 1/190th Anti-tank Battalion

Notes

References
 
 
 
 

World War II orders of battle
Italian campaign (World War II)
1943 in Italy